The Queen's Award for Enterprise: International Trade (Export) (2002) was awarded on 21 April 2002, by Queen Elizabeth II.

Recipients
The following organisations were awarded this year.
AES Engineering Ltd of Rotherham for  Mechanical seals.
Abbott Laboratories Ltd of Queenborough, Kent for  Pharmaceuticals and healthcare products.
Air Bearings Ltd of Poole, Dorset for  Air bearing drilling spindles.
Aircom International of Redhill, Surrey for  Software tools, consultancy and training to the wireless telecoms industry worldwide.
AirSense Technology Ltd of Hitchin, Hertfordshire for  High sensitivity smoke detection equipment.
Anglian Water International of Huntingdon, Cambridgeshire for  Water, wastewater and environmental services.
Argus Media of London N1 for  Energy publication.
ASTRAC Limited of Warwick for  Business intelligence computer software.
Avenue Data Systems Limited of Hull for  Printed swing tickets and woven labels.
Award (TP) International Limited of Cliftonville, Kent for  Promotional merchandise and travel incentives.
BAE SYSTEMS, Land Platform Communications of Blackburn, Lancashire for  Digital intercom systems for high noise platforms.
BAE SYSTEMS (Projects) Limited of Scotstoun, Glasgow, Scotland for  Warships and associated technology, support and spares.
BBC Worldwide of London W12 for  Multiple-media distribution.
BL-Pegson Ltd of Coalville, Leicestershire for  Rock crushing plant and machinery.
Bede Scientific Instruments Ltd of Durham for  X-ray analytical equipment.
Bosch Rexroth Limited of Glenrothes, Fife, Scotland for  Low speed high torque hydraulic motors.
Brett Harris Ltd t/a Snugpak of Silsden, West Yorkshire for  Micro pack size sleeping bags and technical insulated outerwear.
Brush Electrical Machines Ltd of Loughborough, Leicestershire for  Air-cooled electrical turbo-generators.
CFO Europe of London SW1 for  Publishing and event organising.
Calcarb Ltd of Bellshill, Lanarkshire, Scotland for  Carbon bonded carbon fibre thermal insulation.
Casterbridge Tours Ltd of Sherborne, Dorset for  Tour Operator.
Cementation Skanska of Doncaster for  Specialist underground contractors.
Centrax Ltd (TCD) of Newton Abbot, Devon for  Gas turbine engine components.
ClinPhone Group Limited of Nottingham for  Telephone and web based services.
Cognitive Drug Research Ltd of Reading, Berkshire for  Specialist systems for assessing mental functioning in human clinical trials of new medicines.
Cummins Engine Co Ltd, Daventry Engine Plant of Daventry, Northamptonshire for  High horsepower diesel and gas engines.
Cushman & Wakefield Healey & Baker of London W1 for  Commercial property consultancy.
DRS Data & Research Services plc of Milton Keynes for  Document scanning products and services.
Davis & Dann Limited of South Ruislip, Middlesex for  Household goods, toiletries and chemists' sundries.
EMI Records UK (EMIR) of London W6 for  Licensing of recorded music.
Eilers & Wheeler Sales Limited of London SE1 for  Dairy products.
EXi telecoms of Warrington, Cheshire for  Telecoms implementation and support services.
Farnell Electronic Components Ltd of Leeds for  Electronic and industrial components.
The Female Health Company (UK) PLC of London NW10 for  Female condoms.
Global Sealing Technologies of Flint, Wales for  Engineered plastic films and laminates.
Grafton Recruitment International Plc of Belfast, Northern Ireland for  Recruitment agency.
Group Lotus plc of Norwich, Norfolk for  Car manufacture and engineering consultancy services.
HIT Entertainment of London W1 for  Children's TV programmes and characters.
HLF Insurance Holdings Limited t/a The Heath Lambert Group of London EC3 for  International insurance and reinsurance broking services.
Hammersmith Medicines Research Ltd of London NW10 for  Medicines research.
Holset Engineering Company Limited of Huddersfield for  Turbochargers and air handling systems for medium and heavy duty diesel engines.
Hoya Lens U.K. Limited of Wrexham, Wales for  Ophthalmic lenses.
Humax Electronics Co. Ltd of Newtownards, County Down, for Northern Ireland Digital set top boxes.
Intec Telecom Systems PLC of Woking, Surrey for  Operations support systems software for telecommunications companies.
Inverness Medical Limited of Inverness, Scotland for  Blood glucose monitoring systems.
ipTEST Limited of Guildford, Surrey for  Test systems for power semiconductors.
iSOFT Group Plc of Manchester for  Software for patient information management systems.
James Johnston & Co of Elgin Ltd of Elgin, Morayshire, Scotland for  Cashmere and fine woollen goods.
Kone Service Business Unit Bristol Factory of Bristol for  Elevator and escalator control equipment and associated modernisation packages.
LTV Copperweld Bimetallic UK Ltd of Telford, Shropshire for  Copper-clad steel wire and strand.
Lavenham Leisure Ltd of Long Melford, Suffolk for  Horse rugs and quilted jackets.
LIFFE (Holdings) plc of London EC4 for  Derivatives exchange.
Linklaters of London EC2 for  Legal services.
The Loop Communication Agency Ltd of Bristol for  Corporate communications.
Mabey and Johnson Limited of Reading, Berkshire for  Prefabricated steel bridges.
N. P. Mander Ltd t/a Mander Organs of London E2 for  Building and restoration of traditional pipe organs.
Markem Technologies Limited of Nottingham for  Coding and marking equipment.
Medieval Limited of Manchester for  Pharmaceutical development and research services.
MediSense UK Ltd of Abingdon, Oxfordshire for  Medical diagnostics.
MICE Group PLC of Arley, Coventry for  Marketing support services.
Multichem Ltd of Hexham, Northumberland for  Whiteboard and highlighter inks for marker pens.
Norbrook Laboratories Limited of Newry, County Down, for Northern Ireland Veterinary and human-use pharmaceuticals and animal health products.
Nortel Networks - Monkstown of Newtownabbey, County for Antrim, Northern Ireland Networking and telecommunications equipment.
Novocastra Laboratories Limited of Newcastle upon Tyne for  Immunodiagnostic reagents.
Panache Lingerie Ltd of Rotherham for  Ladies' intimate apparel.
Point Source Ltd of Southampton for  Fibre optic systems.
PolicyPlus International plc of Bath for  Traded endowment policies.
Richards Butler of London EC3 for  Legal services.
Rotran Simulator Logistics Ltd of Cardington, Bedfordshire for  Flight simulator relocations and installations.
SEOS Limited of Burgess Hill, West Sussex for  Visual display systems for aircraft and other simulators, visualization and research.
Schrader Electronics Limited of Antrim, Northern Ireland for  Tyre pressure monitoring systems.
Scientific Update of Mayfield, East Sussex for  Scientific consultancy, conference and educational services.
Herbert Smith of London EC2 for  Legal services.
Sophos PLC of Abingdon, Oxfordshire for  Anti-virus software.
Sterling International Movers Ltd of Northolt, Middlesex for  Corporate relocation services.
Strix Limited of Ronaldsway, Isle of Man for  Components for the domestic appliance industry.
Tellermate plc of Newport, Gwent, Wales for  Electronic cash management systems for the retail and banking sectors.
Theatre Projects Consultants International Limited of London NW5 for  Theatre planning, design and equipment consultants.
Tibbett & Britten Group PLC of Enfield, Middlesex for  Supply chain management.
Timsons Ltd of Kettering, Northamptonshire for  Printing presses.
Tocris Cookson Ltd of Avonmouth, Bristol for  Chemicals for pharmacology and neurochemistry research.
Victrex plc of Thornton Cleveleys, for Lancashire High performance engineering thermoplastics.
A J Walter Aviation Limited of Partridge Green, West Sussex for  Aircraft components.
Warthog Plc of Cheadle, Greater Manchester for  Computer and video games.
The Sheeting Division of Wrapid Manufacturing Ltd of Bradford for  Plastic labelling film.

References

Queen's Award for Enterprise: International Trade (Export)
2002 in the United Kingdom